In Sumerian and Akkadian mythology (and Mesopotamian mythology in general) Hanbi or Hanpa (more commonly known in western text) was the god of evil, god of all evil forces and the father of Pazuzu and Humbaba.  Aside from his relationship with Pazuzu, very little is known of this figure.

See also
 List of Mesopotamian deities

References

Mesopotamian gods
Mesopotamian demons
Evil gods